The following lists events that happened during 2016 in Iraq.

Incumbents
President: Fuad Masum
Prime Minister: Haider al-Abadi
Vice President: Nouri al-Maliki, Usama al-Nujayfi, Ayad Allawi

Events
The Islamic State attacked and briefly seized an Iraqi army base in Al Tarah using suicide car bombers and fighters wearing explosive belts on 1 January. The Iraqi army retook the base with the help of coalition airstrikes on the same day.
Camp Speicher, an Iraqi military base, was attacked by multiple ISIL suicide and car bombers on 3 January. At least 15 Iraqi military and police personnel were killed.
On 12 January, two Islamic State militants set off a bomb outside Al-Jawhara mall in Baghdad, threw hand grenades at passersby, shot at people, and one then killed himself in a suicide bomb attack, killing nine people and injuring 13. Police shot and killed the other militant. In another attack that same day, the Islamic State killed 20 people in a café in Muqdadiya with an IED and a suicide bomb attack.
 After months of protests Saturday April 30, 2016 Protesters who are supporters of Shiite cleric Muqtada al-Sadr breached the Green Zone in Baghdad and stormed the Iraqi Parliament.
On 11 May, at least 62 people died in a truck bombing in Bagdad.
 July 3 – Several suicide car bombings are carried out in a local shopping district in Karrada, Baghdad, Iraq, killing at least 281 and injuring more than 200.

References

See also
Terrorist incidents in Iraq in 2016

 
2010s in Iraq
Years of the 21st century in Iraq